Wilfried "Willi the Kid" Pallhuber (born 4 August 1967) is a former Italian biathlete. At the 2006 Winter Olympics in Turin he competed in his fifth olympics.

Biathlon results
All results are sourced from the International Biathlon Union.

Olympic Games

*Pursuit was added as an event in 2002, with mass start being added in 2006.

World Championships
6 medals (5 gold, 1 bronze)

*During Olympic seasons competitions are only held for those events not included in the Olympic program.
**Team was removed as an event in 1998, and pursuit was added in 1997 with mass start being added in 1999 and the mixed relay in 2005.

Individual victories
6 victories (4 In, 2 Sp)

*Results are from UIPMB and IBU races which include the Biathlon World Cup, Biathlon World Championships and the Winter Olympic Games.

Further notable results
 1990: 2nd, Italian championships of biathlon, sprint
 1991: 1st, Italian championships of biathlon, sprint
 1994: 1st, Italian championships of biathlon, sprint
 1995: 3rd, Italian championships of biathlon, sprint
 1996: 3rd, Italian championships of biathlon, sprint
 1997: 3rd, Italian championships of biathlon
 1999:
 1st, Italian championships of biathlon, pursuit
 2nd, Italian championships of biathlon, sprint
 3rd, Italian championships of biathlon
 2000:
 1st, Italian championships of biathlon, mass start
 2nd, Italian championships of biathlon
 2nd, Italian championships of biathlon, sprint
 2001:
 1st, Italian championships of biathlon
 2nd, Italian championships of biathlon, sprint
 2nd, Italian championships of biathlon, pursuit
 3rd, Italian championships of biathlon, mass start
 2002:
 1st, Italian championships of biathlon
 1st, Italian championships of biathlon, pursuit
 1st, Italian championships of biathlon, mass start
 3rd, Italian championships of biathlon, sprint
 2003:
 2nd, Italian championships of biathlon, sprint
 2nd, Italian championships of biathlon, pursuit
 2004:
 1st, Italian championships of biathlon
 1st, Italian championships of biathlon, sprint
 2nd, Italian championships of biathlon, mass start
 2006:
 1st, Italian championships of biathlon, sprint
 1st, Italian championships of biathlon, pursuit
 2007: 3rd, Italian championships of biathlon, mass start

References

External links
 
 

1967 births
Living people
People from Rasen-Antholz
Germanophone Italian people
Biathletes of Centro Sportivo Carabinieri
Italian male biathletes
Biathletes at the 1992 Winter Olympics
Biathletes at the 1994 Winter Olympics
Biathletes at the 1998 Winter Olympics
Biathletes at the 2002 Winter Olympics
Biathletes at the 2006 Winter Olympics
Olympic biathletes of Italy
Biathlon World Championships medalists
Sportspeople from Südtirol